Platyptilia iberica is a moth of the family Pterophoridae. It is found in the Pyrenees in Spain.

The wingspan 21–23 mm.

The larvae possibly feed on Senecio species.

References

Moths described in 1935
iberica
Endemic fauna of Spain